Miedzierza  is a village in the administrative district of Gmina Smyków, within Końskie County, Świętokrzyskie Voivodeship, in south-central Poland.

The village has a population of 320.

References

Miedzierza
Radom Governorate
Kielce Voivodeship (1919–1939)
Łódź Voivodeship (1919–1939)